Steatocystoma may refer to:
 Steatocystoma simplex
 Steatocystoma multiplex